J.A.D. Jebachandran  was the inaugural Bishop of Thoothukudi - Nazareth, serving from 2006 to 2013.

Notes

 
 

21st-century Anglican bishops in India
Indian bishops
Indian Christian religious leaders
Anglican bishops of Thoothukudi - Nazareth